Hantkeninoidea (Hantkeninacea in older classifications) is a superfamily of foraminifera with planispiral or enrolled biserial tests, found in marine sediments of Paleocene to Miocene age, in which chambers vary from globular to elongate and the primary aperture is equatorial in position. It contains one family, the Hantkeninidae.

Members of the Hantkeninacea were included in the family Hantkeninidae, established by Cushman, 1927, as defined in the Treatise, part C, 1964, which is accordingly included in the Globigerinacea, a superfamily in the foraminiferal suborder, Rotaliina.

References

 Loeblich, A.R. Jr and H. Tappan 1964. Sarcodina Chiefly "Thecamoebians" and Foraminiferida; Treatise on Invertebrate Paleontology, part C Protista 2. R.C. Moore (ed)  Geological Society of America and University of Kansas Press.
 Loeblich, A.R. Jr and H. Tappan 1988. Foraminiferal Genera and their Classification. Van Nostrand Reinhold. see GSI eBook

External links

Foraminifera superfamilies
Globigerinina